Ashley van Rijswijk (born 31 August 2000) is an Australian Paralympic swimmer with an intellectual disability. She represented Australia at the 2020 Tokyo Paralympics.

Personal 
Ashley van Rijswijk is from Tumut, New South Wales and in 2021 is based in Wagga Wagga, New South Wales. She attended Gadara School in Tumut.

Swimming career 
van Rijswijk is classified as a S14 swimmer. In October 2019, she was sidelined with a painful neck injury. “I dived into a pool and had muscle and ligament damage in my C3, 4 and 5 but mainly soft tissue damage.”  At the 2021 Australian Swimming Trials, she swam 1:17.36 in the 100m breaststroke heats to qualify fastest for the final but ended up runner up with a time of 1:17.73. Despite missing the Tokyo 2021 qualifying time by a mere 11 hundredths of a second, she was selected for the 2020 Tokyo Paralympics.

Her main events are the 100m Breastroke SB14 and the 200m individual medley SM14.

At the 2020 Tokyo Paralympics, van Rijswijk qualified for the Women's 100 m Breaststroke SM14 but only manage fifth place. She swam in the Women's 100 m Breaststroke SM14 but did not advance to the final.

In 2021, she is a Southern Sports Academy scholarship athlete.

References

External links

Living people
Intellectual Disability category Paralympic competitors
Female Paralympic swimmers of Australia
S14-classified Paralympic swimmers
Swimmers at the 2020 Summer Paralympics
Sportspeople with intellectual disability
2000 births
Australian female breaststroke swimmers
Australian female medley swimmers
21st-century Australian women